is a passenger railway station  located in the city of  Kurayoshi, Tottori Prefecture, Japan. It is operated by the West Japan Railway Company (JR West).

Lines

Station layout
The station consists of one ground-level side platform and one island platform connected by an elevated station building. The station has a Midori no Madoguchi staffed ticket office.

Platforms

Adjacent stations
West Japan Railway Company (JR West)

History
Kurayoshi Station opened on December 20, 1903. It was renamed  on May 1, 1912, but reverted to its original name on February 14, 1972. With the privatization of the Japan National Railways (JNR) on April 1, 1987, the station came under the aegis of the West Japan Railway Company. A new station building was completed in July 2022.

Passenger statistics
In fiscal 2018, the station was used by an average of 4440 passengers daily.

Surrounding area
Tottori College of Nursing
Tottori Junior College
Tottori Prefectural Kurayoshi General Industrial High School
Kurayoshi North High School
Tottori Prefectural Industrial Human Resource Development Center

See also
List of railway stations in Japan

References

External links 

 Kurayoshi Station from JR-Odekake.net 

Railway stations in Tottori Prefecture
Stations of West Japan Railway Company
Sanin Main Line
Railway stations in Japan opened in 1903
Kurayoshi, Tottori